Twin-Traction Beam (TTB) is an independent suspension system for front drive axles in four-wheel drive Ford F-Series trucks and sport utility vehicles.

Background
Twin-Traction Beam was invented by John A. Richardson and Donald G. Wheatley of Ford Motor Company covered by US patent 3,948,337 issued April 6, 1976. The patent name was “Independent front suspension for front-wheel drive” which was assigned to Ford Motor Company.

The Dana Holding Corporation manufactured the TTB axle for Ford. It uses a universal joint in the center that allows the wheels to move independently of each other. The differential is offset to the driver's side, and a slip yoke is used on the long axle side to allow the shaft to change length. The TTB axles are variations of the Dana 28, Dana 35, Dana 44, and Dana 50.

Applications
Common applications include:

1980–1997 F-150/F-250
1991–1994 Ford Explorer
1984–1990 Ford Bronco II
1980–1996 Ford Bronco
1983–1997 Ford Ranger (North America)
1993-1997 Mazda B series
1991-1993 Mazda Navajo

See also 
Corvette leaf spring
MacPherson strut
Torsion beam suspension
Weissach axle – a variant of Double wishbone suspension with a short link at the front pivot bushing of the lower A-arm

References 

Automotive suspension technologies